The 2021 Hawaii Rainbow Warriors baseball team represented the University of Hawaiʻi at Mānoa during the 2021 NCAA Division I baseball season. Hawaii is competing in the Big West Conference. The Rainbow Warriors played their home games at Les Murakami Stadium. Coach Mike Trapasso lead the Rainbow Warriors in his 20th season with the program.

After a strong start, seeing the Warriors nationally ranked, the program finished the season with a 24–26 record.

Previous season

The 2020 Hawaii Rainbow Warriors baseball team notched an 11–6 (0–0) regular-season record. The season prematurely ended on March 12, 2020 due to concerns over the COVID-19 pandemic.

Preseason

Coaches Poll 
The Big West baseball coaches' poll was released on February 10, 2021. Hawaii was picked to finished 7th in the Big West.

Personnel

Roster

Coaching Staff

Game log

Rankings

2021 MLB Draft

References

External links 
 Hawaii Baseball

Hawaii Rainbow Warriors
Hawaii Rainbow Warriors baseball seasons
Hawaii Rainbow Warriors baseball